William Henry Draper (March 11, 1801 – November 3, 1877) was a lawyer, judge, and politician in Upper Canada later Canada West.

Personal life
He was born near London, England in 1801, the son of Rev. Henry Draper and Mary Louisa. He joined the East India Company at age 15, making at least two voyages to India. In 1820, he settled in Port Hope in Upper Canada. Draper married Augusta "Mary" White in York, Ontario, in 1826, with whom he had several children, including William George Draper and Francis Collier Draper, both well known lawyers; the latter also served as chief of police in Toronto.

He died in Yorkville, Toronto in 1877.

Legal career
Starting in 1822 he studied law under Thomas Ward in Port Hope. He then moved to Cobourg, and finished his articles in the office of George Strange Boulton. In 1828, Draper was called to the bar of the Law Society of Upper Canada. In 1829, he secured a position in the office of John Beverley Robinson and then partnered with Christopher Alexander Hagerman, then solicitor general.

Political career
He was elected to the 13th Parliament of Upper Canada representing Toronto in 1836. Later that year, he was appointed to the Executive Council and became solicitor general the following year. Draper handled many of the prosecutions following the Upper Canada Rebellion of 1837. By 1839 he had broken with his Family Compact friends and set his political goal: "To found a party on a larger basis than ever had been formed before." In 1840, he became attorney general for Upper Canada.  Draper supported the union of Upper and Lower Canada on economic grounds and also believed that, because the British government favoured the union, that it would be better to participate in the process than to criticize from the sidelines.  He was elected to the 1st Parliament of the United Canadas as a moderate conservative and continued as attorney general for Canada West, a member of the Executive Council, and co-leader of the government in the Assembly along with the moderate liberal Samuel Harrison. Although his first attempts to establish a conservative alliance with French Canadians failed, Draper played an important role in enabling Louis-Hippolyte Lafontaine to take office in 1842, even at the cost of resigning himself and seeing Robert Baldwin succeed him as attorney general West.  Draper resumed leading the government 13 December 1843 jointly with Denis-Benjamin Viger, and through the next election of 1844, in which the supporters of Draper, Viger and the governor Charles Metcalfe, including the young John A. Macdonald, won a majority. He continued as government leader until 1847. During this period, legislation was passed dealing with schools in both Canada East and Canada West, although Draper's attempt to establish a University of Upper Canada failed. Draper helped John A. Macdonald gain recognition when he named him to a cabinet post. In 1847, with the arrival of Lord Elgin, Draper resigned from the position of attorney general and became a judge of the Court of Queen's Bench. In 1856, he became chief justice of the Court of Common Pleas of Upper Canada and, in 1869, he became chief justice of the Court of Error and Appeal in Ontario.

References

External links
Biography at the Dictionary of Canadian Biography Online

1801 births
1877 deaths
Members of the Legislative Assembly of Upper Canada
Premiers of the Province of Canada
Members of the Executive Council of the Province of Canada
Members of the Legislative Assembly of the Province of Canada from Canada West
Treasurers of the Law Society of Upper Canada
Attorneys-General of Upper Canada
Attorneys-General of the Province of Canada
Draper, William